Albert Winsborough Yancey (August 6, 1938 – August 26, 1994) was an American professional golfer who won seven times on the PGA Tour and later played on the Senior PGA Tour.

Biography
Born in Chipley, Florida, Yancey lived much of his adult life in the Atlanta metro area. He attended the United States Military Academy in West Point, New York, and was captain of the Cadet golf team. He suffered from a debilitating illness known then as manic-depressive illness, but today it is more commonly called bipolar disorder. His illness first manifested itself during his senior year at West Point. He spent nine months in an Army psychiatric hospital before being discharged.

Yancey's condition was largely in remission until 1974, which allowed him to participate in competitive golf. He won seven PGA Tour events in 13 seasons. He also had six top-5 finishes in major championships: 1967 Masters (3rd), 1968 Masters (3rd), 1968 U.S. Open (3rd), 1970 Masters (4th), 1973 British Open (5th), 1974 U.S. Open (T-3).

In 1974, Yancey's illness resurfaced and led him to be involved in a series of bizarre incidents, for which he was at various times arrested, incarcerated, and institutionalized. One such incident occurred at LaGuardia Airport in 1975. Yancey climbed up on a ladder in the terminal and ordered all white people to one side and all black people to the other, and then proceeded to preach on the evils of racism. During the same incident, he claimed to have all of Howard Hughes' money and stated that he was going to use it to cure cancer. Yancey credited Dr. Jane Parker of Payne Whitney Hospital for correctly diagnosing his condition and prescribing lithium. Lithium, however, caused him to have hand tremors, which forced him to retire from competitive golf. He was able to resume competitive play, however, when Tegretol became available.

Yancey was eventually able to return to life as a productive member of society. In 1984, he took a teaching pro job at three South Carolina clubs. He joined the Senior PGA Tour after reaching the age of 50 in August 1988. During the last five years of his life he became a devoted public speaker and advocate for those with mental illnesses. He formed Bogeys, Birdies & Bert, a group “for the education and support of depressive illnesses” in an effort to spread the message on manic depression and mental illness. He also put on seminars, golfing clinics, tournaments and other charitable events to raise money to treat illness and educate the public.

Legacy
Yancey suffered a fatal heart attack in 1994 at age 56 at the Franklin Quest Championship in Park City, Utah. While on the practice tee preparing for the first round, he experienced discomfort and made a second visit to the first aid tent; he went into cardiac arrest and was pronounced dead at a local hospital a short time later. Yancey is interred at Oakland Cemetery in Tallahassee, Florida, not far from his boyhood home.

He was survived by his wife, Cheryl, their daughter, Andrea, Bert's children from a previous marriage, daughter Tracy and three sons Charles, Scott and Jeffrey, and two grandchildren.

The Bert Yancey Mental Health Golf Tournament, based in Augusta, Georgia, is held annually to benefit local chapters of non-profit national organizations Mental Health America, National Alliance on Mental Illness, and the Depression and Bipolar Support Alliance.

Professional wins (10)

PGA Tour wins (7)

PGA Tour playoff record (2–2)

Other wins (3)
this list is probably incomplete
1962 South Carolina Open
1963 Pennsylvania Open Championship
1969 Argentine Masters

Playoff record
Japan Golf Tour playoff record (0–1)

Results in major championships

WD = withdrew
CUT = missed the half-way cut
"T" indicates a tie for a place

Summary

Most consecutive cuts made – 14 (1971 U.S. Open – 1975 Masters)
Longest streak of top-10s – 2 (1968 Masters – 1968 U.S. Open)

References

External links

American male golfers
PGA Tour golfers
PGA Tour Champions golfers
Golfers from Florida
Leon High School alumni
United States Military Academy alumni
People from Chipley, Florida
People with bipolar disorder
1938 births
1994 deaths